The Cypriot National Road Championships are road cycling championships, held annually, to decide the Cypriot champions in both the road race and time trial disciplines.

Men

Women

See also
National Road Race Championships

References

National road cycling championships
Cycle races in Cyprus